The Black Boys Rebellion, Smith's Rebellion or Allegheny Uprising, was an armed uprising between citizens of the Colony of Pennsylvania and the British Army between March 5 and November 18, 1765. The nine-month uprising began on March 5, 1765, when a wagon train loaded with goods (some illegal "warlike goods" according to provincial law) destined for Indians of the Ohio Country was discovered at Pawling's Tavern (south of Greencastle, Pennsylvania). Alarmed by the train's contents, citizens led by James Smith, intercepted and destroyed the goods (valued over $1 million in today's currency) at a mountain pass at Sideling Hill. The numerous clashes after involved: more destruction, firefights, arrests, kidnapping, legal maneuvers, a court trial, a two-day siege, and one casualty. The casualty, the wounding of colonist James Brown at Widow Barr's is considered by a few to be the first blood drawn of what would become the American Revolutionary War.

The Conococheague settlement on the Pennsylvania Frontier 
By 1763, New France was defeated and the French monarch rescinded claims in North America to the victors, Britain and its colonies. The Native Americans previously aligned with the French began to see their power and influence wane. In an effort recover this influence, Ottawa Chief Pontiac, united the various Indian nations to push British civilization as far east as possible. Fort after fort fell in the West, until the conflict finally reached western Pennsylvania. The front line in this war, Pontiac's War, was the Allegheny Mountains. Centered in the valley of the Pennsylvania Alleghenies was the Conococheague settlement, comprising land that straddled the Conococheague Creek from western Maryland into south-central Pennsylvania. Settling this backcountry wilderness were Scots-Irish and German immigrants. This land, offered by the Quaker government in Philadelphia was cheap but what these people may not have known was that they served as a buffer between Indian land and more affluent European settlements. When Pontiac's warriors attacked frontier homesteads, killing their inhabitants, fear gripped the region much like the early days of the recent French & Indian War (1755–1760). 

When the year 1764 began, it looked as if the frontier of Pennsylvania was entering another peaceful interlude. Pontiac's forces were defeated at the Battle of Bushy Run, Colonel Henry Bouquet was in the process of negotiating with the Ohio Indians, and it looked as if Europeans taken by the Indians during the French and Indian War would be returning to their homes. In order to prevent future conflict, Britain instituted a series of laws under the Proclamation of 1763. Under these laws, Britain's native subjects were forbidden to receive "war-like" trade items (guns, knives, tomahawks, gunpowder, rum, whiskey, etc.) and European subjects were forbidden to settle beyond the Proclamation Line, a vertical line of demarcation that ran through the middle of present-day Pennsylvania and which established the official edge of western expansion.

In June 1764, hostilities again enveloped the region. On June 26, 1764, four Delaware Indian warriors entered a log schoolhouse near present-day Greencastle and killed ten children and their schoolmaster, Enoch Brown. Before arriving to the schoolhouse these warriors had encountered a pregnant woman, Susan King Cunningham, at Markes, Pennsylvania (near Fort Loudoun). She was beaten to death, scalped, and the baby was cut out of her body. These events horrified the German and Scot-Irish communities.

The Conococheague settlement in present-day Franklin County (then Cumberland County) bordered the Proclamation Line. Even though the proclamation forbade Western movement, West was the only direction in which the expansion of European settlement could continue. The next stepping stone was the Ohio country and no one understood this better than businessmen and land speculators.

James Smith and the Black Boys 
In want of protection, frontier settlers looked for men capable of defending them against the Indian raids and donated monies to establish a company of rangers to protect the settlement. The rangers leader was a twenty-eight-year-old Scots-Irish immigrant by the name of James Smith. As a teenager, James Smith joined a road-cutting crew in 1755 in response to the French and Indian threat. He was one of James Burd’s men, responsible for hacking out a road to support General Edward Braddock’s invasion of western Pennsylvania. One day, on work detail, he was captured by an Indian scouting party, taken to Fort Duquesne, and made to run the gauntlet. Surviving the beating, he was adopted into an Ohio tribe and lived as an Indian for five years until escaping back to the Conococheague in 1760.

As an expert on Indian ways, notably survival and fighting, Smith was an obvious choice to lead this company in the defense of the Conococheague in 1763. Smith chose two men, also former captives, to serve as his subalterns. Thirty to thirty-five German and Scots-Irish men volunteered and were trained in the Indian manner of fighting and living. Each man brought their personal firelock, either a rifle, fusil, or smoothbore rifle, and were outfitted according to Smith:
Sometime in May, this year [1763]…about that time the Indians again commenced hostilities, and were busily engaged in killing and scalping the frontier inhabitants in various parts of Pennsylvania. The whole Conococheague Valley, from the North to the South Mountain, had been almost entirely evacuated during Braddock’s war…As the people were now beginning to live at home again, they thought [it] hard to be driven away a second time, and were determined if possible, to make a stand: therefore they raised as much money by collections and subscriptions, as would pay for a company of rifle-men for several months. The subscribers met and elected a committee to manage the business. The committee appointed me captain…and gave me the appointment of my subalterns. I chose two of the most active young men that I could find, who had also been…in captivity with the Indians. As we enlisted our men, we dressed them uniformly in the Indian manner, with breech-clout, leggings, moccasins and green shrouds which we wore in the same manner that the Indians do, and nearly as the Highlanders wear their plaids. In place of hats we wore red handkerchiefs, painted our faces red and black, like Indian warriors. I taught them the Indian discipline, as I knew of no other at that time, which would answer the purpose much better than British.
Once properly equipped and trained, Smith's rangers set off on Indian trails toward the enemy. It would be ten months before these rangers returned. During their time away the Conococheague settlement remained relatively untouched by the violence of Pontiac’s Rebellion, while homesteads as far east as Carlisle were attacked.

The Black Boys name origin 
James Smith and his men referred to themselves (in letters of the time) as the "Loyal Volunteers" and as the "Sideling Hill Volunteers". The only mention of Smith's men as "the Black Boys" appears in the deposition of Sergeant Leonard McGlashan (42nd Regiment of Foot) on August 20, 1765, who writes: "we were fired upon warmly for some time by the Black Boys...". The name may have been coined by the highlanders. The name "Black Boys" could have referred to the town of origin (Black's Town) of the rioters as was customarily done at the time, i.e. Paxton Boys (Paxton, PA), however that is unlikely because the town was known as Smith's Town after William Smith bought the town's properties of James Black in 1759. Smith's men did outfit and paint themselves to resemble Native Americans with the paint colors in variations of red, black, etc. (as Smith mentioned in his journal) The rebels were observed with "black'd" faces in March and May 1765 which was used to conceal their identities. However, they soon after dropped the practice because any remnant of black smudge behind the ears was enough to arrest a person as was done on occasion.

George Croghan 
A provincial law forbade the trading of "war-like" trade items (guns, knives, tomahawks, gunpowder, lead, rum, whiskey, etc.) to Indians. George Croghan's role as deputy Indian agent also forbade his trading goods with Indians for profit and his receiving land from them. He, his trading partners, and the Philadelphia merchants who supplied the goods disregarded these restrictions and the provincial law.

Anticipating a change in trade policy that would again open trade with the native populations, George Croghan moved to position himself for trade opportunities in the Ohio country. Croghan was an Indian agent, entrepreneur, and businessman nicknamed "Big Business" by the Indians. He devised a plan to establish himself west of the Proclamation Line before other traders and speculators, with the potential to gain immense wealth through land speculation in Ohio. The only problem was how to get around the Proclamation's prohibitions against trading warlike goods with the Indians. Due to the necessity of achieving peace with the Indians in the Ohio Country, British officials, led by Colonel Henry Bouquet, approached Croghan with a mission to transport British trade goods deep into the Ohio country. This was the opportunity Croghan was waiting for and seized upon this chance by purchasing more for his gain.

Baynton, Wharton and Morgan 
Unknown to General Gage and high army command, George Croghan secretly approached Baynton, Wharton, & Morgan (BW&M) of Philadelphia sometime in late 1764 with a proposal. BW&M received goods by ship from Britain, kept warehouses, and sold goods at wholesale to businessmen who in turn would sell or trade goods to consumers on the frontier, both traveling merchants and shopkeepers in Carlisle, Pennsylvania. Wishing to set up shop himself, Croghan planned to transport £20,000 to £30,000 sterling worth of goods from Philadelphia to Fort Pitt and open trade with the Ohio Indians. Croghan, his business partners, and men of influence weighed the pros and cons of transporting goods to Fort Pitt. Croghan must have believed there would be little reason to fear inspection in late February 1765. He readied the trade goods and loaded them onto wagons destined for Fort Pitt. By February 1765 Croghan's shipment of goods was ready to move west.

Incident at Pawling's Tavern, March 5, 1765 

On March 5, 1765, a wagon train loaded with goods approached Pawling's Tavern in Greencastle, Pennsylvania. Waiting to receive them were 81 horses with pack saddles and their drivers. Due to the rough terrain of the Alleghenies, pack horses were preferred as each could carry roughly 200 pounds of goods. This eighty-one pack horse "train" was four times larger than the average (average was 20 horses and two drivers) and carried roughly eight tons of trade goods. During the transfer of goods, one of the packages fell to the ground, causing an on-looker to see the package's holdings which he believed looked like scalping knives. Word spread fast from Pawling's Tavern to Greencastle and the surrounding area that Croghan's pack train was carrying illegal goods of a war-like nature. With the most recent atrocities of the Enoch Brown Schoolhouse still fresh in resident's minds, the local citizenry buzzed with concern. Almost immediately, concerned citizens approached and directed the pack train drivers to be properly inspected at Fort Loudoun. These requests were ignored. When the pack train approached Justice William Smith's House in Mercersburg, a group of fifty to 100 armed citizens confronted them. These citizens requested that the drivers store the goods at Fort Loudoun until it could be confirmed that the Indians had signed a peace agreement and that the governor had opened trade. Again the pack horse drivers refused and proceeded on to McConnell's Tavern.

Pack train destroyed at Sideling Hill, March 6, 1765 
On March the 6, 1765, concerned citizens worried about future atrocities appealed to one of their own, James Smith. Smith gathered his former rangers, the Black Boys, and set out to intercept the pack train. About 1 o’clock on March 6, Smith and his men met the pack train at Sideling Hill, west of the Great Cove. Smith asked the drivers to turn around and be properly inspected at Fort Loudoun (the closest government authority). The drivers refused. Smith and his men then attacked the pack train, killed and wounded several horses, and burnt most of the trade goods (6 horses were killed and 60 loads of goods burnt, according to William Smith). The drivers fled in the direction of Fort Loudoun.

First confrontation between citizens and British soldiers 
Once at the fort, the pack horse drivers pleaded with the commanding officer, Lieutenant Charles Grant, 42nd Regiment of Foot, falsely stating that local highwaymen had destroyed the King's goods rather than admitting that those were illegal trade goods. Being bribed by the trader in charge, Lt. Grant sent a patrol to the site of the attack. The patrol was ordered to bring back any goods that were not destroyed, and to make prisoners of anybody that they suspected were involved in the attack. Sergeant Leonard McGlashan and twelve men (highlanders) arrived at Sideling Hill and found a heap of scorched goods:…about 12 o Clock at Night I met with a party of men to the number of seven who run off upon their perceiving us. I called to them several times to stop but to no purpose. Some of them brand new blankets about them…part of the goods that we were sent to protect…which…gave me great reason to believe that these people had a hand in destroying the goods. Consequently I gave order to pursue them…half way up the mountain…one prisoner, which I myself took with two rifles in his hand & one other prisoner…These two prisoners I committed to the care of the Corporal and four men in the rear of my party while I proceeded in the front…at the top of the mountain, the Corporal in the rear perceiving some people creeping through the woods called to the front upon which (I) turned back and gave chase to them through the woods upon which there were two shots fired by some of the party.   Contrary to my orders I then proceeded to the Great Cove to the house of Will McConnell. it Being the place where the Rioters Rendesvouzed at the Day they Burnt the Goods as we was Inform d I thought in all probability I might find some of them there consequently on my arrival at the said House I made strict Enquiry and Examined Every Body in the House but finding no Reason to suspect any of them it being a publick Inn I Left the Corporal and four Men there to take Care of the prisoners while I with the Rest of my party Proceeded to the Ground where the Goods were destroyed at which place we arrived about Six o Clock in the Morning of the seventh Instant and found a few Horse Loads of Rum untouched but the dry goods in ashes…Fifty armed citizens confronted the detachment resulting in the taking of prisoners and weapons, by the patrol. Within two days, James Smith and 200–300 armed citizens surrounded the fort and forced Lieutenant Grant to give up the prisoners, on March 11, 1765. Grant refused to turn over the weapons and so began the nine-month rebellion.

Reaction from Benjamin Franklin and General Thomas Gage 
Due to the massive financial losses incurred by businessmen who had funded the trading party, and the participation of the King's troops, word spread far beyond the borders of Pennsylvania. In New York, General Thomas Gage, Commander-in-Chief of British North America, wrote to Sir William Johnson on April 15, 1765:…Mr: Wharton, who might, if he had chose it, have given you a very clear Information respecting Mr. Croghan’s Goods and others which were destroyed by the Country-People and this is owing to Mr. Croghan troubling his Head more about Trade than the Business he was employed in. Had he thought proper to have followed his Instructions, and made use of Colonel Bouquet’s Permit to get up his Presents, which would if necessary have procured him Escort at every Post, no Accident could have happened. Instead of this, He takes upon himself to enter into Leagues with Traders to carry up Goods in a Clandestine Manner under Cover of the Business he was employed in of going to the Ilinois; contrary to orders, and contrary to the Laws of the Province.Benjamin Franklin, who is in London on business for Pennsylvania, first learned of the events from his associate from Philadelphia, John Ross:…Even His Majestys troops have been attack’d and fired upon, as you will perceive by the Inclosed Account I rec’d from Mr. Robert McGaw an Attorney at Law at Carlisle, a Young Gentleman of Veracity. In short, if His Majesty will not Accept and take Care of this flourishing Province, it’s hard to determine how such proceedings of a Lawless Mob will End. Certain it is, small hopes of Security to person or property remain….Benjamin Franklin responds on the matter:The Outrages committed by the Frontier People are really amazing! But Impunity for former Riots has emboldened them. Rising in Arms to destroy Property publick and private, and insulting the King’s Troops and Forts, is going great Lengths indeed! If, in Mr. Chief’s Opinion, our Resolves might be call’d Rebellion What does the Gentleman call this? I can truly say it gives me great Concern. Such Practices throw a Disgrace over our whole Country, that can only be wip’d off by exemplary Punishment of the Actors, which our weak Government cannot or will not inflict. And the People I pity, for their want of Sense. Those who have inflam’d and misled them have a Deal to answer for.In a short time after Franklin learned of the events, the news made the press in London. On May 23, 1765, the London Chronicle printed the first of seven articles concerning the riotous events on the Pennsylvania frontier. These anonymous letters detailed the inability of the Penn family to maintain order, and pressed for a stronger Royal government. Although the source of those letters remained anonymous, the style, tone, and content suggest that it was likely Benjamin Franklin.

The Black Boys' inspection regime 
In an effort to monitor trade, the citizens of the Conococheague declared that they will inspect any and all goods moving west in Pennsylvania. James Smith and Justice William Smith created an inspection regime to monitor trade until the matters with the British government were resolved. Essentially Smith's men would stop travelers and search for illegal goods without having the Crown's endorsement. Once cleared, the traveler would receive a letter of safe passage signed by either Justice Smith or James Smith. Examples of these letters, such as the one below, may be found at the Pennsylvania State Archives:By William Smith, Esq, One of His Majesty's Justices of the Peace of said County

Permit the Bearer, Thos. McCammis to pass to Fort Bedford with nine Kegs of Rum, Eight Kegs of Wine, One Keg of Spirits, One Keg of Molassas, Three Kegs of brown Sugar, Four Kegs packed with Loaf Sugar and Coffee and Chocolate. In all, Twenty Kegs and one bag of Shoes. Provided always that this Permit shall not Extend to Carry any Warlike Stores or any Article not herein mentioned.

Given under my Hand & Seal 15th May 1765

Signed WM SMITH

As the Sidling Hill Volunteers have already inspected these goods, and as they are all private property, it is Expected that none of these brave fellows will molest them upon the Road, as there is no Indian Supplies amongst them. Given under my Hand, May 15, 1765.

Signed JAS. SMITH

Shootout at Widow Barr's 
On the morning of May 5, 1765, at a tavern near Justice Smith's home, a messenger arrived with news of illegal goods moving north of Fort Loudoun. Around twenty of Smith's men mobilized and raced to meet this pack train finding it near Rouland Harris's home. This pack train was carrying goods that were meant for the garrison of Fort Pitt (ordered, bought and paid by Henry Bouquet and the Crown). Arguments ensued between the two parties until violence erupted killing a few horses. The pack drivers fled to Fort Loudoun.

Early that evening Lieutenant Grant discovered panicked men arriving at the fort gate claiming that highwaymen abused them and destroyed the King's goods. Grant ordered Sgt McGlashan and twelve highlanders to inspect the site and arrest any suspicious by-standers. McGlashan arrived at Harris's place and found the goods in a burning heap, but no one of suspicious character. Confused as to which direction the highwaymen went, but wishing to pursue, McGlashan employed Rouland Harris to serve as scout to engage the Black Boys. McGlashan found them one mile north of the fort at one-story house referred to as "Widow Barr’s." McGlashan reported on what happened next:I pressed the aforementioned Harris to pilot me the way, when upon our arrival at the Widow Barr’s House, they fired one shot supposed to be upon us. We, not thinking that we were so near them and looking from whence the shot was fired, we saw the party, called out to stop but they not stopping, one shot was fired upon them by some of my party, in return of which, several shots were fired supposed on us on our retreat to the Widow Barr’s. I then gave orders to fire and my party being on clear ground and they in the woods obliged us to take possession of the Widow Barr’s House where we were fired upon warmly for some time by the Black Boys, being between seventy and eighty in number as near as I can guess. Before we went into the house we made one man prisoner he being under arms and appeared as if he had been blacked in the face but had attempted to rub it off but did not do it effectually which prisoner we kept about one hour and then released him being persuaded by a country man that happened to come there as he prayed by chance and told us that if I did not release the aforementioned prisoner, neither me nor any of my party, would ever get back to the Fort upon which I released him and proceeded back to Fort Loudoun.As McGlashan and his men retreated back to Fort Loudoun, Smith's men gathered themselves and headed back to Justice Smith's to regroup. Amazingly, no one was killed during the firefight, although one Black Boy by the name of James Brown was shot and wounded in the thigh. Had there been fatalities on either side, tensions likely would have escalated even further. After the firefight at the Widow Barr's home, Justice Smith and James Smith demanded to inspect the goods delivered at the fort, but were denied access by Lieutenant Grant's assurance that they were Officer's goods destined for Fort Pitt, officially ordered by Brigadier General Henry Bouquet. The Black Boys also wanted Grant to return their personal property, the nine firearms that he was holding in his possession since March of that year.

Warrant to arrest Sgt. Leonard McGlashan 
Shortly after the shoot-out at Widow Barr's, the Black Boys reconvened at Justice William Smiths residence, including, James Brown, who was recovering from being shot through the thigh. The opportunity arrived for Justice Smith to exercise his powers as magistrate and take legal action against British Government by filing a warrant for the arrest of Sgt. Leonard McGlashan:To The Constable of Peters' Township

Compliant upon the Oath being made to me, Wm. Smith, being one of his Majesty's Justices of the Peace for said county, by James Brown, that he was wounded by being shot thro' the thigh by Leonard McGlashan, Serjeant.

You are Hereby Commanded in his Majesty's name to apprehend him, the Said McGlashan, & him the said McGlashan being so taken or Delivered, you are to Bring Before me, or the Next Justice for Said County, in order to answer to Said Complaint & be farther prosecuted Against According to Law.

WM. SMITH

The Black Boys' advertisement 
On eared in Cumberland County in May, purportedly from the Black Boys, inviting volunteers to "come to our Tavern and fill your Bellys with Liquor & your Mouth full of Swearing" (Peters Township.)

The kidnapping of Lieutenant Charles Grant 
On May 28, 1765, when out patrolling a few miles north of Fort Loudoun, the Black Boys spotted what appeared to be a British Highlander officer on horseback. It was Lieutenant Grant. Grant recalled:I was Riding out, & about a mile from this post as I..was waylay’d by five Men Armed, Namely, James Smith, Samuel Owens, John Piery, & two others…all under the Command of the aforesaid James Smith, Some called out to Catch me, others to Shoot me; On which I Rushed thro’ them, & on passing one of them attempted to Catch my Horse by the Bridle, Notwithstanding I passed them all; and when they saw that I was out of their hands, one of them fired a Gun, whether at me or my Horse, I cannot say, at which my horse Started into the Thickett which occasioned my falling, the Rioters then came up to me, made me as they said the King’s prisoner, upon which one of them said, "take the Dirk of the Rascall." I asked them for what? They said they would let me know that before I would go home. I asked them where they were taking me to? They said they would take me before Justice Reyonald. I asked if it would not do as well to go before Justice Smith, being the most Convenient. They Said that their orders was to Bring me before Justice Reyonald. They Brought me into the Woods that night Seven Miles from my post, & there Kept me all night without any Manner of Shelter; they told me that they would Carry me away into the Mountains & keep me there, & that in the meantime the Country would Rise & take the Fort by force of Arms, & by that means they would have all the goods in the Fort as well as their Own Arms. I told them that it was not in my power to give up their Arms without orders from my Commanding officer, & told them they would be dealt with as Rebels if they would do what they threatened. Their Commander, James Smith, said that they were as Ready for a Rebellion as we were to oppose it, & they acknowledge that their proceedings were Contrary to law; & after holding a Council Determined to go off to Carolina & take me along. They set out, & brought about eight Miles farther...They asked them what they would have me do in the Matter, as I told them before how much it was out of my power to Deliver up their Arms? They asked me if I would give Security to Deliver up their Arms or pay £40 To which I consented Rather than go to Carolina, on which they agreed to Bring me to an Inn at Justice Smith’s, Where I gave a Bond for £40 if I did not deliver up their Arms in five Weeks.Five weeks came and gone but Lt. Grant did not pay £40 nor return the nine firearms taken in March.

Song by George Campbell about the Black Boys, c. 1765 
Song written by George Campbell, an Irish gentleman, educated in Dublin was a prolific songwriter in the 18th century. Song was meant to be sung to the tune of the "Black Joke". 

Ye patriot souls who love to sing,

What serves your country and your king,

In wealth, peace, any royal estates,

Attention give whilst I rehearse,

A modern fact, in jingling verse,

How party interest strove what it cou’d,

To profit itself by public blood,

But, justly met its merited fate.

Let all those Indian traders claim,

Their just reward, inglorious fame,

For vile base and treacherous ends.

To Pollins, in the spring they sent,

Much warlike stores, with an intent

To carry them to our barbarous foes,

Expecting that no-body dare oppose,

A present to their Indian friends.

Astonish’d at the wild design,

Frontier inhabitants combin’d

With brave souls, to stop their career,

Although some men apostatiz’d,

The bold frontiers they bravely stood,

To act for their King and their country’s good,

In joint league, and strangers to fear.

On March the fifth, in sixty-five,

Their Indian presents did arrive,

In long pomp and cavalcade,

Near Sidelong Hill, where in disguise,

Some patriots did their train surprise,

And quick as lightning tumbled their loads,

And kindled them bonfires in the woods,

And mostly burnt their whole brigade.

At Loudon, when they heard the news,

They scarcely knew which way to choose,

For blind rage and discontent;

At length some soldiers they sent out,

With guides for to conduct the route,

And seized some men that were trav’ling there,

And hurried them into Loudon where

They laid them fast with one consent.

But men of resolution thought,

Too much to see their neighbors caught,

For no crime but false surmise;

Forthwith they join’d a warlike band,

And march’d to Loudon out of hand,

And kept the jailors pris’ners there,

Until our friends enlarged were,

Without fraud or any disguise.

Let mankind censure or commend,

This rash performance in the end,

Then both sides will find their account.

‘Tis true no law can justify,

To burn our neighbors property,

But when this property is design’d

To serve the enemies of mankind,

It’s high treason in the amount.

Notes

References

History of Pennsylvania